María José Fernández Vallés (born 4 March 1965), better known as Pepa Fernández, is a Spanish journalist. She is the director and presenter of the Radio Nacional de España (RNE) program .

Biography
Pepa Fernández was born in the town of Cervera, Lleida in 1965. Her father's family is from Ourense. At 18 she started working in radio. She earned a licentiate in Information Sciences from the Autonomous University of Barcelona. Since 1999, she has been directing and presenting the RNE program , a weekend magazine which has received several awards.

She is a professor at Ramon Llull University's Faculty of Communication.

Fernández has worked on several television programs.

Awards and recognitions
 2002: Radio de Cambio 16 Award
 2003: Ondas Award for Best Nationally Broadcast Radio Program for No es un día cualquiera
 2007: Pica d'Estats Award
 2008: Ondas Award for Professional Career
 2009: Emilio Castelar Award for Effective Communication
 2009: Micrófono de Oro
 2010: El Cava Journalism Award
 2013: Dionisio Duque Foundation Award for communication, innovation, and new technologies
 2015: José Antonio Labordeta Award for Communication
 2015: 
 2016: Concha García Campoy Journalism Award
 Two Micrófonos de Plata from the Spanish Professional Association of Radio, Press, and Television News (APEI)
 Antena de Oro

Books
 Lo que la vida enseña, Esfera de los Libros, 2008,

References

External links

 

1965 births
20th-century Spanish journalists
21st-century Spanish journalists
Autonomous University of Barcelona alumni
Living people
People from Segarra
Radio directors
Academic staff of University Ramon Llull
Spanish radio journalists
Spanish television personalities
Spanish women journalists
Spanish radio presenters
Spanish women radio presenters
Women radio directors
20th-century Spanish women